Caroline is a female given name, derived from the male name Karl (Charles). Common nicknames and variations include Caz, Callie, Carole, Carol, Carolyn, Carly and Carrie.

People with the name

Empresses consort
Caroline Augusta of Bavaria (1792–1873), Empress of Austria by marriage to Francis I of Austria

Queens consort
Caroline of Ansbach (1683–1737), British queen consort of King George II
Caroline Amalie of Augustenburg (1796–1881), Danish queen consort of King Christian VIII
Caroline of Baden (1776–1841), first Queen consort of Bavaria by marriage to Maximilian I Joseph of Bavaria
Caroline Bonaparte (1782–1839), queen consort of Joachim, King of Naples
Caroline of Brunswick (1768–1821), queen consort of George IV of the United Kingdom
Caroline Matilda of Great Britain (1751–1775), British monarch, sister of King George III and Queen of Denmark and Norway by marriage to King Christian VII

Princesses
Princess Caroline Elizabeth of Great Britain (1713–1757), Hannover princess, daughter of King George II of Great Britain and Caroline of Ansbach
Caroline, Princess of Hanover (born 1957), formerly heir presumptive to the throne of Monaco, daughter of Grace Kelly
Princess Caroline of Hesse-Darmstadt (1746–1821)
Princess Caroline Louise of Hesse-Darmstadt (1723–1783), consort of Baden, artist, collector, salonist and scientist
Landgravine Caroline of Hesse-Rotenburg (1714–1741), Princess of Condé by marriage to Louis Henri, Duke of Bourbon
Princess Caroline of Nassau-Usingen (1762–1823), daughter of Karl Wilhelm, Prince of Nassau-Usingen, and wife of Landgrave Frederick of Hesse-Kassel
Princess Caroline Louise of Saxe-Weimar-Eisenach (1786–1816), princess of Mecklenburg-Schwerin
Princess Caroline-Mathilde of Denmark (1912–1995), Danish monarch

Other aristocrats
Countess Caroline Felizitas of Leiningen-Dagsburg (1734–1810), German countess
Caroline, Countess of Cranbrook (born 1935), English aristocrat and food activist
Countess Caroline of Nassau-Saarbrücken (1704–1774), Countess Palatine of Zweibrücken by marriage to Christian III of Zweibrücken
Countess Palatine Caroline of Zweibrücken (1721–1774), Landgravine of Hesse-Darmstadt by marriage to Louis IX, Landgrave of Hesse-Darmstadt
Caroline Lacroix (1883–1948), mistress of Leopold II of Belgium
Carolyne zu Sayn-Wittgenstein (1819–1887), Polish noblewoman associated with Franz Liszt

Others
Caroline Aaron (born 1952), American actress
Caroline Abadie (born 1976), French politician
Caroline Abbé (born 1988), Swiss footballer
Caroline Abraham (1809–1877), New Zealand artist
Caroline Adderson (born 1963), Canadian novelist and short story writer
Caroline Aherne (1963–2016), British comedian, actress and writer
Caroline Ailin (born 1989), Norwegian singer and songwriter
Caroline Allen (born 1992), American motorcycle racer
Caroline Ansell (born 1971), British politician
Caroline Anthonypillai (1908–2009), Sri Lankan trade unionist and founder of the Lanka Sama Samaja Party
Caroline Archer (1922–1978), Aboriginal Australian activist and telephonist
Caroline Arft (born 1996), German canoeist
Caroline Armington (1875–1939), Canadian painter
Caroline Arnott (1859–1933), English philanthropist
Caroline Ashley (born 1958), Scottish television actress
Caroline Starr Balestier Kipling (1862–1939), wife of writer Rudyard Kipling
Caroline Bancroft (1900–1985), American journalist and Ziegfeld Folly
Caroline Bardua (1781–1864), German painter
Caroline Baron, American film producer and philanthropist
Caroline Bartlett Crane (1858-1935), American Unitarian minister, suffragist, educator, journalist, and sanitation reformer
Caroline Becker (1826–1881), Finnish photographer
Caroline Bedell Thomas (1904–1997), American cardiologist
Caroline Beil (born 1966), German actress and television presenter
Caroline Bergvall (born 1962) German–born French–Norwegian poet
Caroline Birley (1851–1907), English geologist, fossil collector and children's author
Caroline Bittencourt (1981–2019), Brazilian model and television presenter
Lady Caroline Blackwood (1931–1996), English writer
Caroline Blake (1835–1919), Irish hotelier and landlord
Caroline Bliss (born 1961), English actress
Caroline Bowen (born 1944), New Zealand speech pathologist
Caroline Brady (1905–1980), American philologist
Caroline Brasch Nielsen (born 1993), Danish fashion model
Caroline Brazier, Australian actress
Caroline Brettell (born 1950), Canadian cultural anthropologist
Caroline Brown Bourland (1871–1956), American professor
Caroline Brown Buell (1843–1927), American activist
Caroline Bruzelius, American art historian 
Caroline Buchanan (born 1990), Australian cyclist
Caroline Burckle (born 1986), American swimmer
Caroline Burke (1913–1964), American actress, art collector, writer, and television and theater producer
Caroline Byrne (1970–1995), Australian model
Caroline Caddy (born 1944), Australian poet
Caroline Calloway (born 1991), American internet personality
Caroline Cameron (born 1990), Canadian television sportscaster
Caroline Carleton (1811–1874), English–born Australian poet
Caroline Casagrande (born 1976), American government official
Caroline Catz, English film, television, narrator, theatre and radio actress
Caroline Champetier (born 1954), French cinematographer
Caroline Chariot-Dayez (born 1958), Belgian painter
Caroline Charrière (1825–1873), Swiss composer and conductor
Caroline Chepkwony (born 1985), Kenyan long distance runner
Caroline Chesebro (1825–1873), American writer
Caroline Chevin (born 1974), Swiss soul singer
Caroline Chikezie (born 1974), Nigerian–English actress
Caroline Chisholm (1808–1877), Australian social reformer
Caroline Chomienne (1957–2020), French film director
Caroline M. Clark Woodward (1840–1924), American activist and writer
Caroline Clive (1801–1873), English writer
Caroline B. Cooney (born 1947), American author
Caroline Corr (born 1973), Irish drummer
Caroline Craig (born 1975), Australian actress
Caroline Crawford (born 1949), American actress and singer
Caroline Crawley (1963–2016), English singer
Caroline A. Crenshaw, American attorney
Caroline Cruveillier (born 1998), French boxer
Caroline Criado Perez (born 1984), Brazilian–English feminist author, activist and journalist
Caroline D'Amore (born 1984), American model and actress
Caroline Dayer (born 1978), Swiss feminist educator and writer
Caroline Delas (born 1980), French rower
Caroline Demmer (1845–1898), German–Austrian actress and singer
Caroline Desbiens, Canadian politician
Caroline Dhavernas (born 1978), Canadian actress
Caroline Dhenin (born 1973), French tennis player
Caroline Matilda Dodson (1845–1898), American physician
Caroline Dolehide (born 1998), American tennis player
Caroline Donald, British journalist and author
Caroline Dowdeswell (born 1945), English actress
Caroline Lowder Downing, British suffragette, sister of Edith Downing
Caroline Ducey (born 1976), French actress
Caroline Dumas (born 1935), French soprano
Caroline Duprez (1832–1875), French soprano
Caroline Alice Elgar (1848–1920), English writer and poet
Caroline Fiat (born 1977), French politician
Caroline Finch, Australian statistician
Caroline Flack (1979–2020), English television presenter
Caroline Flint (born 1961), British politician
Caroline Foot (born 1965), British butterfly swimmer 
Caroline Freeman (1856–1914), English educator and first woman to graduate from the University of Otago
Caroline Furness Jayne (1873-1909), American ethnologist
Caroline Ganley (1879–1966), British politician
Caroline Garcia (born 1993), Dhenin's French compatriot and tennis player
Caroline Leigh Gascoigne (1813–1883), British poet and writer
Caroline Gooding (1959–2014), British solicitor and disability rights activist
Caroline Love Goodwin O'Day (1869–1943), American congresswoman 
Caroline Gordon (1895–1981), American novelist and literary critic
Caroline Grills (c.1888–1960), Australian serial killer
Caroline Harrison (1832–1892), American first wife to the 23rd President of the United States Benjamin Harrison and founder of the National Society of the Daughters of the American Revolution
Caroline Haslett (1895–1957), English electrical engineer, electricity industry administrator and champion of women's rights
Caroline Hazard (1856–1945), American educator, philanthropist, and author
Caroline Healey Dall (1822–1912), American feminist writer, transcendentalist, and reformer
Caroline Heron (born 1990), Scottish footballer
Caroline Herschel (1750–1848), German astronomer
Caroline Herzenberg (born 1932), American physicist
Caroline Howard Gilman (1794–1888), American writer
Caroline Howard Jervey (1823–1877), American author and poet
Caroline Dana Howe (1824–1907), American poet and writer
Caroline Johnson (born 1977), British politician
Caroline Keating Reed (d. 1954), American pianist and music teacher
Caroline Kennedy (born 1957), American author and attorney, the daughter and only surviving child of U.S. President John F. Kennedy
Caroline Killeen (1926–2014), American activist
Caroline Alice Lejeune (1897–1973), British writer
Caroline Leonetti Ahmanson (1918–2005), American fashion consultant, businesswoman and philanthropist
Caroline Mary Luard (1850–1908), British murder victim
Caroline Lucas (born 1960), British politician
Caroline Lufkin (born 1981), Okinawan-American musician
Caroline Marmon Fesler (1878–1960), American philanthropist and patron of art and music
Caroline Marshall Woodward (1828–1890), American author
Caroline May (1820-1895), English-American poet and editor
Caroline Moorehead (born 1944), English human rights journalist and biographer
Caroline Mwatha (died 2019), Kenyan human rights activist
Caroline Myss (born 1952), American self-help, spirituality and mysticism author
Caroline Néron (born 1973), Canadian actress
Caroline Nichols Churchill (1833–1926), American newspaper editor, suffragist and writer
Caroline Norton (1808–1877), English writer and social reformer
Caroline Pellew (1882–1963), British geneticist
Caroline Polachek (born 1985), American musician
Caroline Quentin (born 1960), British actress and television presenter
Caroline Rhea (born 1964), Canadian actress
Caroline Ridderstolpe (1793–1878), Swedish composer
Caroline M. Sawyer (1812–1894), American poet, biographer and editor
Caroline Schelling (1763–1809), German intellectual and writer
Caroline Schermerhorn Astor (1830–1908), American socialite
Caroline Seger (born 1985), Swedish footballer
Caroline Severance (1820–1914), American abolitionist, suffragist, and the founder of women's clubs
Caroline Shaw (born 1982), American Pulitzer Prize-winning composer
Caroline Shawk Brooks (1840–1913), American sculptor
Caroline Henrietta Sheridan (1770–1851), English novelist
Caroline Skeel (1872–1951), British historian
Caroline Anne Southey (1786–1854), English poet
Caroline Spencer (1861–1928), American physician and suffragist
Caroline St-Hilaire (born 1969), Canadian politician from Quebec
Caroline Stoll (born 1960), American tennis player
Caroline Sunshine (born 1995), American actress, singer, and civil servant
Caroline Szyber (born 1981), Swedish politician 
Caroline Townshend (1878–1944), British stained glass artist of the Arts and Crafts Movement
Caroline Trentini (born 1987), Brazilian fashion model
Caroline Uhler (born 1983), Swiss statistician
Caroline Vis (born 1970), Dutch tennis player
Caroline von Wolzogen (1763–1847), German novelist and biographer
Caroline Weir (born 1995), Scottish footballer
Caroline Weldon (1844–1921), Swiss-American artist and activist with the National Indian Defense
Caroline Wensink (born 1984), Dutch volleyball player
Caroline Winberg (born 1985), Swedish model
Caroline Wittrin (born 1968), Canadian hammer thrower
Caroline Wozniacki (born 1990), Danish tennis player
Caroline Zhang (born 1993), American figure skater

Fictional characters

Caroline, in the 1994 American black-comedy movie The Ref
Caroline Alessi, former character on the Australian soap opera Neighbours
Caroline Beaufort, the mother of scientist Victor Frankenstein in Mary Shelley's novel Frankenstein
Caroline Bingley, from Jane Austen's Pride and Prejudice
Caroline Brady, on the American soap opera Days of our Lives
Carrie Brady Reed or Caroline Anna Brady-Reed, character on the American soap opera Days of our Lives
Cara Castillo or Carolyn Castllio, character on the American soap opera All My Children
Carly Benson Corinthos-Jacks or Caroline Leigh Benson Corinthos-Jacks, character on the American soap opera General Hospital
 Caroline Farrell, the original identity of main character Echo on the TV series Dollhouse
Caroline Forbes, one of the protagonists on the TV series The Vampire Diaries
Coraline Jones, the protagonist of the novel Coraline (sometimes miscalled Caroline)
Caroline Lindstrom, in 2001 American independent comedy-drama movie Little Secrets
Caroline Spencer, current character on the American CBS soap opera The Bold and the Beautiful 
Caroline Spencer Forrester, former character on the American CBS soap opera The Bold and the Beautiful

See also

Caro (given name)
Carolina (name)
Carolyne
Karoline
Karolina (disambiguation) 

Given names
Dutch feminine given names
English feminine given names
English-language feminine given names
Finnish feminine given names
French feminine given names
Irish feminine given names
Scottish feminine given names
German feminine given names
Norwegian feminine given names
Swedish feminine given names
Danish feminine given names
Icelandic feminine given names
Swiss feminine given names